The Governor of Blackness Castle was a military officer who commanded the fortifications at Blackness Castle, a Scottish fortress on the Firth of Forth. Held by the Crown since 1453, Blackness saw military use until 1912 and a brief revival during the First World War.

Governors of Blackness
1702–1707: David Erskine, 9th Earl of Buchan
1707–1710: Charles Murray, 1st Earl of Dunmore
1710–1714: David Erskine, 9th Earl of Buchan
1714–1723: Lord William Hay
1723–1741: Hon. William Kerr
1744?–1791: Charles Hope-Weir
1792–1806: Hon. Charles Hamilton 
1806–1812: Sir James Henry Craig
1812–1814: Rowland Hill, 1st Baron Hill
1814–1818: Albemarle Bertie, 9th Earl of Lindsey
1818–1830: Sir Hew Dalrymple, 1st Baronet
1830–1837: Frederick Augustus Wetherall
office abolished on Wetherall's resignation

References

Blackness Castle